Tiago Prado Nogueira (born 3 May 1984), or simply Tiago Prado, is a Brazilian football defender.

On 29 December 2010, Tiago signed a contract with Consadole Sapporo.

On 31 July 2011, Consadole Sapporo cancelled its contract.

Club statistics

Honours

Grêmio

 Campeonato Brasileiro Série B: 2005

Figueirense

 Campeonato Catarinense: 2006

Porto Alegre

 Campeonato Gaúcho — Second Division: 2009

References

External links
 
 
 Tiago Prado at Futpédia 
 

1984 births
Living people
People from Rondonópolis
Brazilian footballers
Brazilian expatriate footballers
Grêmio Foot-Ball Porto Alegrense players
Kyoto Sanga FC players
Hokkaido Consadole Sapporo players
Figueirense FC players
Vila Nova Futebol Clube players
Porto Alegre Futebol Clube players
Esporte Clube Pelotas players
Chengdu Tiancheng F.C. players
China League One players
Expatriate footballers in Japan
Expatriate footballers in China
Campeonato Brasileiro Série A players
J2 League players
Brazilian expatriate sportspeople in China
Association football defenders
Sportspeople from Mato Grosso